The Veleno guitar is a highly regarded series of aluminium guitars built by metal craftsman John Veleno. A prototype was completed in 1967.

The first guitars were built in 1972. Veleno guitars are known for their unique sound quality.

List of notable artists who own Veleno guitars
Marc Bolan of T.Rex 
Eric Clapton
Gregg Allman of the Allman Brothers Band
Lou Reed
Johnny Winter
Ace Frehley of Kiss
Todd Rundgren
Dolly Parton
Sonny Bono
Chris Pontius
Steve Albini of Shellac
Pete Haycock of the Climax Blues Band
Ray Monette of Rare Earth 
Mark Farner of Grand Funk Railroad, who owned three Veleno guitars
Ronnie Montrose of Montrose and The Edgar Winter Band
Jeff Lynne of Electric Light Orchestra
Mick Mars of Mötley Crüe
Ed Kuepper of The Saints
Keith Levene of Public Image Ltd. and The Clash
Robby Krieger of The Doors
David Surkamp of Pavlov's Dog
David Robinson of The Cars (Veleno guitar shown on their "Panorama" album)
Vincent Gallo
Johnny Depp
Frank Hannon of Tesla
Twiggy Ramirez of Marilyn Manson
Eric Erlandson of Hole
Justice (band)
John Lennon
Kurt Cobain of Nirvana
Steve Stevens of Billy Idol

References
Wheeler, Tom. American Guitars: An Illustrated History. Harper Perennial. New York. 1992. 

Guitars